Congo is a chess variant invented by Demian Freeling in 1982 when he was nearly 8 years old. His father (Dutch abstract games designer Christian Freeling) encouraged him to design a variant using a 7×7 gameboard. Demian was already familiar with chess and xiangqi, and the result blends some features from both. Congo became the second-most popular chess variant at the Fanaat games club in Enschede, the Netherlands.

For his Congo engine, Ed van Zon won "Best of the Zillions" First Contest, Best Chess-Related Category in March 2001.

Board
The play is on the squares of a 7×7 gameboard. The board has two 3×3 castles to house the lions. A river divides the board horizontally across the center.

Game rules
The starting setup is as shown. White (brown pieces in the diagram) moves first. Players alternate turns; there is no passing. The game is won by capturing the opponent's lion. The game immediately ends when a lion has been captured.

Moving out of check is not mandatory in Congo, and a lion may move to an attacked square, but the opponent wins immediately by simply capturing it. Consequently, Congo also has no draw by stalemate—stalemate is simply an extreme form of zugzwang, resulting in a loss for the stalemated player.

Lion
The lion moves and captures one step orthogonally or diagonally in any direction—the same as a king in chess. It may not leave its 3×3 castle. The lion also has the special power to capture the enemy lion by moving as a chess queen across the river along an unobstructed  or diagonal—like the special "flying general" move of a xiangqi general.

Zebra
The zebra moves and captures the same as a chess knight.

Elephant
An elephant can move [to] and capture [on] a square one or two orthogonal steps away. If two steps away, the move or capture must be in a straight line, and the intervening square is jumped (whether occupied or not, unlike the xiangqi elephant which is blocked by a diagonally adjacent piece). Unlike the xiangqi elephant, it may cross the river.

Giraffe
The giraffe moves (but does not capture) one step in any direction. It can also move [to] and capture [on] a square two steps away in any direction in a straight line. The intervening square is jumped (whether occupied or not).

Monkey
The monkey moves (but does not capture) one step in any direction. It can also capture an enemy man on an adjacent square (orthogonally or diagonally) by jumping over it to the vacant square immediately beyond. As in international draughts, multiple captures are permitted with the same piece in the same turn.

In a multi-capture move:
 successive jumps can be in different directions;
 a given man may be jumped only once;
 a given square may be visited more than once;
 all men jumped are removed from play only after the entire multi-capture move has completed.

Unlike draughts, a capturing move is never mandatory in Congo.

Crocodile
The crocodile moves and captures one step in any direction. It can also move and capture as a chess rook toward the river along a file (including entering the river), as well as down the river when in the river.

Pawn
A pawn moves and captures one step straight or diagonally forward. When past the river, it can also move (but not capture) one or two steps straight backward (without jumping).

A pawn promotes to superpawn when reaching the last rank. A superpawn has the same move/capture as a pawn, but in addition can move and capture one step straight sideways, and move (but not capture) one or two steps straight or diagonally backward (without jumping). A superpawn's powers are not dependent on its position on the board.

Drowning
Except for the crocodile, any piece ending its move in the river must leave the river the next turn or it drowns. A drowned piece is removed from play at the end of the turn.

A monkey may enter and leave the river during a multi-capture move without consequence; it drowns if and only if it ends two consecutive turns in the river.  If the monkey drowns after completing a multi-capture move, the captures it made are still legal.

Endgame observations
 If only two lions remain, and neither can immediately capture the other, the game is a draw. 

See also
 Chakra (chess variant)

References

Bibliography

External links
Official website MindSports.nl
Congo The Chess Variant Pages

Fanaat games club (the Netherlands)
Congo a simple program by Ed Friedlander (Java)

Chess variants
1982 in chess
Board games introduced in 1982